The Twentieth Amendment of the Constitution of India, officially known as The Constitution (Twentieth Amendment) Act, 1966, inserted a new article 233A inter alia validating the appointments, postings, promotions, and transfers of and judgements, delivered before the commencement of the present Act, by district judges who were appointed, posted, promoted or transferred as a district judge in any State otherwise than in accordance with the provisions of article 233 or article 235 of the Constitution.

Text

Proposal and enactment
The Constitution (Twentieth Amendment) Act, 1966 was introduced in the Lok Sabha on 25 November 1966, as the Constitution (Twenty-third Amendment) Bill, 1966 (Bill No. 89 of 1966). It was introduced by Yashwantrao Chavan, then Minister of Home Affairs, and sought to insert a new article 233A in the Constitution. The full text of the Statement of Objects and Reasons appended to the bill is given below:

The Bill was debated and passed by the Lok Sabha on 3 December 1966, with only formal amendments to replace the word "Twenty third" by the word "Twentieth" in the short title as well as in the proposed new article 233A. The Bill was considered and passed by the Rajya Sabha on 9 December 1966. The bill received assent from then President Zakir Hussain on 22 December 1966, and came into force on the same date. It was notified in The Gazette of India on 23 December 1966.

See also
List of amendments of the Constitution of India

References

20
1966 in India
1966 in law
Indira Gandhi administration